Shumia (also Romanized as Shūmīā, Shoomiya, and Shūmīyā; also known as Shūmā) is a village in Ahlamerestaq-e Jonubi Rural District, in the Central District of Mahmudabad County, Mazandaran Province, Iran. At the 2006 census, its population was 1,086, in 266 families.

References 

Populated places in Mahmudabad County